is a Japanese animation studio based in Nishiogikubo, Tokyo.

History
Lapin Track was established on June 30, 2014 by former members of the animation studio Brain's Base.

Works

Television series

Original video animations

Films

References

External links
 Official website 

Japanese companies established in 2014
Mass media companies established in 2014
Japanese animation studios
Animation studios in Tokyo
Suginami